Debora Vivarelli (born 28 January 1993 Bolzano) is an Italian table tennis player. She competed in the women's single tournament at the 2020 Summer Olympics.

She competed at the Italian Youth Championships She plays for Appiano.

References

External links
Vivarelli Debora at Tokio 2020 Olympics 

1993 births
Living people
Italian female table tennis players
Table tennis players at the 2020 Summer Olympics
Olympic table tennis players of Italy
Table tennis players at the 2019 European Games
European Games competitors for Italy
Sportspeople from Bolzano
20th-century Italian women
21st-century Italian women